Marta Tienda is an American sociologist. From 1997 to 2001, she served as the director of the Office of Population Research at Princeton University. She is the co-author and co-editor of many books, including The Hispanic Population of The United States (1987).

References

Year of birth missing (living people)
Living people
American sociologists
American women sociologists
Princeton University faculty
Fellows of the American Academy of Political and Social Science
American Journal of Sociology editors
21st-century American women